Matthew B. Schrier is an American former photographer who escaped from al Qaeda.

Early life and career
Schrier is from Deer Park, New York, and attended Hofstra University, where he was an English major who also studied film production.  He entered Syria with the help of the Free Syrian Army. Schrier captured images of FSA rebels fighting forces of the Syrian president Bashar al-Assad.

Abduction by the al-Nusra Front 
In late December 2012, Schrier was captured by Jabhat al-Nusra, the Al-Qaeda affiliate in Syria, while traveling on the road between Aleppo and the Turkish border. A Jeep Cherokee cut across from the side of the road and three men jumped out. Schrier told 60 Minutes, "One of 'em was cloaked completely in black, you know, like the guys in the movies -- scarf around his face, AK-47 in his hand, and he took me out, put me in the back seat of the Cherokee and he put the barrel of the gun to the side of my head." He was among a collection of kidnapped American journalists held by Syrian jihadis. He was eventually held in a series of rebel-controlled prisons in the Syrian city of Aleppo.

He strategically converted to Islam in March 2013 as a survival tactic to get better treatment, a tactic that ended up working.

Escape 
In July 2013 Schrier became the first Westerner to ever escape from al Qaeda.  Before sunrise he squeezed himself through a small window with the help of his cellmate Peter Theo Curtis, who got stuck in the window and did not escape. According to Schrier, this was despite his best efforts to get him out. Curtis has given multiple, conflicting accounts of the escape attempt. He has said that Schrier failed to help him adequately and abandoned him, and he has said that he told Schrier to go for help. During the planning of the escape, Schrier claims that Curtis knocked on the door to alert the guards about the escape, a claim Curtis admitted in an interview with Die Zeit.

Aftermath
His book The Dawn Prayer (Or How to Survive in a Secret Syrian Terrorist Prison): A Memoir was published on April 3, 2018.

In January 2020, Schrier filed a lawsuit against Qatar Islamic Bank (QIB), as he claimed that they provide sponsorship for al-Qaeda.

See also 

 2014 American Intervention in Syria
 Foreign hostages in Iraq
 Kenneth Bigley
 Nick Berg
 James Foley (journalist)
 Daniel Pearl
 Steven Sotloff
 Austin Tice

References

External links 
Matthew Schrier interview
http://www.jpost.com/Middle-East/The-only-Jew-to-have-escaped-from-al-Qaida-411445
http://www.zeit.de/2015/35/geisel-al-kaida-geiselhaft-syrien-aleppo-al-nusra

American Jews
American people taken hostage
American photographers
Hofstra University alumni
Kidnapped American people
People from Long Island
People from Syosset, New York
Travel photographers
Living people
War photographers
Year of birth missing (living people)